Laberinto is the seventh extended play from South Korean boy band UP10TION. It was released on December 6, 2018, by TOP Media. The album consists of seven tracks, including the title track, "Blue Rose". This album is also the last time members Lee Jin-hyuk and Kim Woo-seok have promoted with the group and has been on hiatus since then.

Background 
UP10TION released their first studio album "Invitation" back in March of 2018. After that, the group had 3 tours in Japan, North America and Europe in May, June and September separately with a total of 15 shows. They also released their Japan 3rd album "Chaser" on August 8 and their 2018 Special Photo Edition on August 20.

Release and promotion 
On November 22, 2018, TOP Media release the schedule for UP10TION's seventh mini-album "Laberinto". On December 6, UP10TION released the music video for the eponymous single "Blue Rose". The group held their showcase at Ilji Art Hall. The group started promoting on music shows starting on December 7 on Music Bank then on Show! Music Core, Inkigayo and M Countdown. They also promoted the side track "With You" once on Music Bank. 

On January 11, 2019, UP10TION ended the promotions for the album after 6 weeks.

On January 19, The group proceeded to promoted Laberinto in Japan with 2 showcases on January 19 and 27. They also held performance events between January 20 through February 3 for their promotion activities.

Concept and album 
The album name "Laberinto" means maze and labyrinth in Spanish. The album had two versions, "Clue" and "Crime" version. Each version had a 84 page booklet, 1 tarot card and 1 agent card.

Songs 
Wei and Bitto were co-credited for six out of the seven songs while Kuhn was co-credited for five out of the seven songs on the album.

The first track, "Laberinto" is a intro song for their album. The next song is "Blue Rose" which is the title track. Wei described the song as "dramatic" and "magnificent feeling". The lyrics are talking about how "the more you are hurt by a woman, the deeper you fall into her".

Commercial performance
The EP sold 40,428+ copies in South Korea. It peaked at number 4 on the Korean Gaon Chart.

Track listing

Credits and personnel 

 Jinhoo - vocals, background vocals
 Kuhn - rap
 Kogyeol - vocals, background vocals 
 Wei - rap
 Bitto - rap
 Wooshin - vocals
 Sunyoul - vocals, background vocals
 Gyujin - vocals, background vocals
 Hwanhee - vocals, background vocals
 Xiao - vocals, background vocals

Released history

References 

2018 EPs
Korean-language EPs
Kakao M EPs
Up10tion EPs